Sarah Nichilo-Rosso (born 22 October 1976) is a French judoka. She competed at the 1996 Summer Olympics and the 2000 Summer Olympics.

She placed third in both the 1996 Olympic games and in the 1999 Judo World Championships in Birmingham. In the 2001 World Championships in Munich she placed 7th.

References

External links
 

1976 births
Living people
French female judoka
Olympic judoka of France
Judoka at the 1996 Summer Olympics
Judoka at the 2000 Summer Olympics
Place of birth missing (living people)
Mediterranean Games bronze medalists for France
Mediterranean Games medalists in judo
Competitors at the 2001 Mediterranean Games
20th-century French women
21st-century French women